Zigzagopora is an extinct genus of bryozoans thought to belong to the family Sagenellidae, containing one species, Zigzagopora wigleyensis. It is distinctive because of its "zig-zag" appearance. The "fortuitous" species name references the Wigley Quarry in Oklahoma where it was found.

References

Prehistoric bryozoan genera